Woman Playing the Clavichord or The Clavichord Player (French - La Joueuse de clavicorde) is a 1645-1650 oil on canvas painting by Bernardo Cavallino, which has been in the collection of the Museum of Fine Arts of Lyon since 1968. It was probably painted as a pair to the same artist's The Singer (Museo Capodimonte, Naples).

Italian paintings
1640s paintings
Paintings in the collection of the Museum of Fine Arts of Lyon
Musical instruments in art